Nathaniel Willis Parker IV (born May 22, 1971) is a businessman and Republican politician who has served in the Texas Senate, representing the 12th district since 2023. He served in the Texas House of Representatives from 2007 to 2023. He was elected in 2006 to represent District 63. Parker sought the position of Texas House Speaker with the retirement of Joe Straus but then withdrew his candidacy in 2018 to support the consensus choice, Representative Dennis Bonnen of Angleton in Brazoria County. As of 2022, Parker was elected to represent senate district 12, and will continue his public service as a State Senator.

Background
Parker was educated at the University of Dallas, at which he served in the College Republicans Club. He earned a Bachelor of Arts degree in political philosophy and Economics in 1993.  In 1992 he worked briefly in the White House of George H. W. Bush. He later earned a Master's Degree from the London School of Economics.

Parker  serves on several board of directors and advisory councils, including the University of Dallas, Communities in Schools North Texas, the Children’s Advocacy Center for Denton County, and Kyle’s Place, an emerging shelter project for homeless teens.

Parker resides in Flower Mound with his wife of over 20 years, Beth Haugan Parker, who he met while a student at the University of Dallas. The Parkers have two daughters, Lauren and Ashley.

Political career
In 2006, Parker first ran for state office when his predecessor, Mary C. Denny, vacated the seat for House District 63. He faced four opponents in the Republican primary election, including Lewisville ISD board president Anne Lakusta, who received the endorsement of the Dallas Morning News.  Parker garnered the most votes in the primary but needed a runoff to defeat Lakusta.  No other party fielded a candidate in the general election, so Parker's runoff election win earned him the seat.

In 2008, Parker faced two candidates, Democrat Jesus Carrillo and Libertarian candidate John Turner. He defeated both with 64,048 votes (72.97 percent) to Carrillo's 19,883 (22.65 percent) and Turner's 3,831 (4.36 percent).

In 2010, he was unopposed in both the Republican primary and the general election.

In 2012, Parker ran unopposed in the Republican primary election and defeated Bruce Hermann Libertarian in the general election, which took place on November 6, 2012.

In 2014, he ran unopposed in the Republican primary election. He faced Democrat Daniel Moran in the general election and defeated Moran with 30,809 votes (77.3%) to Moran's 9,026 (22.7%).

In 2015, Parker's colleagues elected him the Chairman of the House Republican Caucus and he was chosen later that year as the best legislator by Texas Monthly magazine.

On March 1, 2016, he once again won the Republican primary election for House District 63. Parker is currently serving his sixth term in the Texas House of Representatives.

Upon entering the 85th Legislative Session, Parker was unanimously re-elected as the chairman of the House Republican Caucus, which represents the Republican members of the Texas House by supplying its members with policy development and other crucial support services.

On March 8, 2018, Parker became the third member of the House of Representatives to file for Speaker of the Texas House of Representatives to replace  Joe Straus, a moderate Republican, who steps down with the regular legislative session in January 2019. He subsequently won reelection on November 6, 52,893 votes (67.2 percent) to 25,852 (32.8 percent) for his Democratic opponent, Laura Haines. Thereafter, he left the speaker's race. His campaign website describes him as an, "Authentic conservative working for HD63."

On July 7, 2021, Parker announced his bid to run for the Texas Senate, for District 12 in 2022. The announcement comes two days after District 12 current Senator Jane Nelson announced her retirement from the Senate. On March 1, 2022, Parker won the Republican nomination with 53,212 votes (71.07 percent) to 21,657 (28.93 percent) for Chris Russell  Parker won the 2022 General Election against Francine Ly, with a margin of 23-points.

References

External links
Tan Parker's campaign Web site
Texas House of Representatives bio

|-

1971 births
Living people
People from Flower Mound, Texas
Alumni of the London School of Economics
Republican Party members of the Texas House of Representatives
University of Dallas alumni
Businesspeople from Texas
21st-century American politicians
Republican Party Texas state senators